Rune Marthinussen (born 10 February 1970) is a retired Norwegian football midfielder.

Hailing from Narvik, he spent most of his career in Mjølner, including the time Mjølner competed under the moniker Narvik FK. He played the 1994 Tippeligaen season in Tromsø IL and got 10 league games. In 2002 he helped Fredrikstad FK win promotion to the second tier, then was player-manager for two seasons in FK Vesterålen. After that he moved back to Tromsø and coached IF Skarp, then Tromsdalen UIL.

References

1970 births
Living people
People from Narvik
Norwegian footballers
FK Mjølner players
Tromsø IL players
Fredrikstad FK players
Norwegian First Division players
Eliteserien players
Association football midfielders
Norwegian football managers
Sportspeople from Nordland